In Greek mythology, Leucippus (Ancient Greek: Λεύκιππος Leukippos, "white horse") was a young man of Phaestus, Crete. Leucippus was born to Lamprus, the son of Pandion, and Galatea, daughter of Eurytius the son of Sparton. He is notable for having underwent a magical gender transformation by the will of the goddess Leto. Due to his transition from female to male, Leucippus can be considered a transgender male figure in Greek mythology.

Mythology 
When Galatea was pregnant, Lamprus told her he would only accept the child if it was male, but Galatea gave birth to a female infant while Lamprus was away pasturing his cattle. Following the advice of seers, Galatea gave her child a masculine name, Leucippus, and told her husband that she had given birth to a son.

Leucippus was raised as a boy, but upon approaching puberty, it became necessary to conceal his female sex from Lamprus. Galatea went to the sanctuary of Leto and prayed that Leucippus could become biologically male.

Leto took pity on Galatea and granted the prayer, and Leucippus became male.

In commemoration of this event, the people of Phaestus surnamed Leto Phytia (from Greek φύω "to grow"). They established a feast in honor of Leto, which was called Ecdysia (from Greek ἑκδύω "to undress"), named for Leucippus who was able to remove his peplos after his transformation. The festival became an annual initiation ritual, focused on the transition of boys to men graduating from the youth corps agela. The "young [men] were required to put on women's clothes and swear an oath of citizenship," wherein "herds of youth [would] strip off their peploi publicly to reveal themselves as powerful ephebi," reenacting Leucippus's transformation.

It became a custom for brides and bridal couples of Phaestus to lie beside an image of Leucippus at weddings.

Similar stories 
The story of Leucippus is similar to that of Iphis the child of Ligdus and Telethusa. Other gender transitions in Greek legends include Caeneus, Teiresias, Hypermnestra (otherwise known as Mnestra) who sold herself as a woman and then changed into a man to return home, and Siproites of Crete who transformed into a woman to see Artemis bathing.

Note

References 
 Antoninus Liberalis, The Metamorphoses of Antoninus Liberalis translated by Francis Celoria (Routledge 1992). Online version at the Topos Text Project.

Metamorphoses into the opposite sex in Greek mythology
LGBT themes in Greek mythology
Transgender topics and mythology
Cretan characters in Greek mythology